Lucía Dammert is a Peruvian and Chilean political scientist and politician. From March 2022 to September 2022 she was chief of advisors in the government of Gabriel Boric. During the second government of Michelle Bachelet (2014–2018) she worked as chief of advisors for minister Mahmud Aleuy.

References

es:Lucía Dammert

1972 births
Chilean political scientists
Peruvian political scientists
Living people